Jacob ben Hayyim ben Isaac ibn Adonijah or Jacob ben Chayyim (c. 1470 – before 1538), was a scholar of the Masoretic textual notes on the Hebrew Bible, and printer. Born in Tunis (hence sometimes called Tunisi), he left his native country to escape the persecutions that broke out there at the beginning of the sixteenth century. After residing at Rome and Florence he settled at Venice, where he was engaged as corrector of the Hebrew press of Daniel Bomberg. Late in life he became Messianic. Jacob's name is known chiefly in connection with his edition of the Rabbinical Bible (1524–25), which he supplied with Masoretic notes and an introduction which discusses the Masorah, qere and ketib, and the discrepancies between the Talmudists and the Masorah. The value of his activity as a Masorite was recognized even by Elijah Levita, who, however, often finds fault with his selections.

Jacob's introduction to the Rabbinical Bible was translated into Latin by Claude Capellus in 1667, and into English by Christian D. Ginsburg (Longman, 1865). Jacob also wrote a dissertation on the Targum, prefixed to the 1527 and 1543-44 editions of the Pentateuch, and published extracts from Moses ha-Nakdan's Darke ha-Nikkud weha-Neginot, a work on the accents. He revised the editio princeps of the Jerusalem Talmud (1523), of Maimonides' Yad, and of many other works from Bomberg's press.

Works 
C.D. Ginsburg, Jacob ben Chajim ibn Adonijah's Introduction to the Rabbinic Bible, London: Longman, 1865; reprinted with the Masoret ha-Masoret of Elias Levita, New York: KTAV, 1968.
Jacob Ben Chajim Ibn Adonijah's Introduction to the Rabbinic Bible, Ginsburg, London, 1867; Digital Copy: Ginsburg, 1867: Jacob Ben Chajim Ibn Adonijah's Introduction to the Rabbinic Bible.

Jewish Encyclopedia Bibliography 
De Rossi, Dizionario, p. 322;
Nepi-Ghirondi, Toledot Gedole Yisrael, p. 197;
Christian D. Ginsburg, Massoret ha-Massoret, pp. 33–34, London, 1867;
Oẓar Neḥmad, iii.112;
Steinschneider, Cat. Bodl. col. 1205;
Fürst, Bibl. Jud. iii.451.

References 

 

1470 births
16th-century deaths
Year of birth uncertain
Year of death unknown
Jewish biblical scholars
Jewish printing and publishing
15th-century Jewish biblical scholars
16th-century Jewish biblical scholars